Rančevo is a small settlement (hamlet) in Serbia. It is situated in the Sombor municipality, West Bačka District, Vojvodina province.

Geography

Officially, Rančevo is not classified as a separate settlement, but as suburban part of the town of Sombor. It is located between Gakovo, Stanišić, and Bilić.

See also
Sombor
List of places in Serbia
List of cities, towns and villages in Vojvodina

References
Vojvodina - auto karta, Magic Map, Smederevska Palanka, 2001.

External links
Rančevo location map

Places in Bačka
Sombor
West Bačka District